Zangiabad (also Romanized as Zangīābād) is a city in the Central District of Kerman County, Kerman Province, Iran.  At the 2006 census, its population was 6,666, in 1,598 families.

References

Populated places in Kerman County

Cities in Kerman Province